Bergamo is a shopping mall located in Nungambakkam, Chennai, India. The mall opened in August 2012 with Louis Vuitton as its first store. The mall is designed by DSP architects and built by KKA Buildtech at a cost of 10 Crore. It is considered to be the first luxury mall in Chennai, and the third in India. The building is designed to house 24 stores, each with an area ranging from 1600 sq. ft to 2000 sq. ft. Named after an Italian city, the white three storey building is influenced by classical Italian architecture.

References

Shopping malls in Chennai
Shopping malls established in 2012
2012 establishments in Tamil Nadu